The Russian Assembly was a Russian loyalist, right-wing, monarchist political group (party). It was founded in Saint Petersburg in October−November 1900, and dismissed in 1917. It was led by Prince Dmitry Golitsyn. It opposed liberal western parliamentarianism, and advocated 'the old formula of Autocracy, Orthodoxy and Nationality'.

It consisted mainly of right-wing officers and civil-servants in St. Petersburg.

Leaders
It approved the rights of 120 full members of the party and elected the supreme governing body, the Board of 18 members. Prince Dmitri Petrovich Golitsyn was elected a chairman of the Council; members of the Board journalist Aleksey Suvorin and writer Sergei Syromyatnikov as his two deputies.

Another 15 members of the first Board were:
Army generals: Mikhail Borodkin, Alexander Vasilyev, count N. Geiden, Akim Zolotaryov;
 Statesmen: baron R. Disterlo, V. Lyschinsky, Alexander Krivoshein, Alexey Kharuzin; librarian of the State Chancellery S. Yuferov;
Publishers Col. Vissarion Komarov and Alexey Suvorin, censor Nikolay Sokolov
Writers A. Papkov and Nikolai Engelhardt, poet Vasiliy Velichko.

Among those elected to the Board subsequently were
 Nobility: Princes – Michael Volkonsky (later one of the leaders of the Union of Russian People), А. А. Куракин, A. Lobanov-Rostovsky, M. Shakhovskoy; Counts – P. Apraksin, Aleksei Bobrinsky, Sergei Toll; Baron M. Taube.
 Clergy: bishop Seraphim Chichagov (later one of the founders of the Union of Russian People)
 Statesmen: Alexei Khvostov, Vladimir Gurko, M. Govorukha-Otrok, A. Karamzin, N. Myasoedov, A. Chemodurov, Nikolai Zverev (later one of the founders of the Russian Peripheral Society),

Notable members
Prime ministers Boris Stürmer and Alexander Trepov
Minister of Interior Vyacheslav von Plehve
 Statesmen: Vladimir Purishkevich, Nikolai Zajączkowski
Army generals: N. Peshkov, N. Belyavsky, К. И. Величко, P. Mitropolski
Publisher S. Voyeikov; editors P. Bulatzel (newspaper "Russkoye Znamya"), A. Puryshev ("Vestnik Russkogo Sobraniya"); journalist S. Bournashev
Professors and historians: Timofei Butkevich, Platon Kulakovskiy, Boris Nikolskiy, V.Pogozhev.

References

Bibliography
 

Political parties in the Russian Empire
Conservatism in Russia
Defunct nationalist parties in Russia
Political parties established in 1900
Political parties disestablished in 1917
1900 establishments in the Russian Empire
Russian nationalist organizations